Animus (Latin for "mind" or "soul") is a Law Latin term used in a variety of contexts to designate the motivations of a legal person.

Criminal law 

In criminal law, animus nocendi ("intention to harm") refers to an accused's guilty state of mind with respect to the actus reus of the crime. It is thus analogous to mens rea, a more commonly used term in common law countries. The term dates back Roman understandings of censorship, where it referred to an author's impermissible intention in writing a literary work. 

In Scots law, the term animus malus ("evil intention") is sometimes used.

Family law 
In family law, animus deserendi refers to one spouse's firm intention to leave the matrimonial home—and hence the marriage. When combined with the "factum of separation," it "constitute[s]" desertion. Proof of desertion, in turn, has been grounds for divorce in some legal systems.

Property law 

In property law, animus possidendi ("intent to possess") refers to a person's manifest intention to control an object, and is one of the two elements—along with factum possidendi (the "fact of possession")—required to establish property in an object by first possession.

In both civil and common law, animus revertendi distinguishes an animal in which one may have a property right from a wild animal (which one cannot own) by reference to the animal's habitual return to a person who cares for it. Blackstone describes the doctrine as follows:The law therefore extends … possession farther than the mere manual occupation; for my tame hawk that is pursuing his quarry in my presence, though he is at liberty to go where he pleases, is nevertheless my property; for he hath animum revertendi. So are my pigeons, that are flying at a distance from their home … and likewise the deer that is chafed out of my park or forest, and is instantly pursued by the keeper or forester: all which remain still in my possession, and I still preserve my qualified property in them. But if they stray without my knowledge, and do not return in the usual manne[r], it is then lawful for any stranger to take them.

United States constitutional law 

In the jurisprudence of the Equal Protection Clause of the United States Constitution, animus designates an improper government purpose in passing legislation. According to Dale Carpenter, the animus doctrine involves "scrutinizing the reasons for government action." If the legislature exhibits bias toward a protected class, the law is unconstitutional regardless whether the law might be justifiable on other grounds. The Supreme Court of the United States defined the concept for the first time in Department of Agriculture v. Moreno (1973), holding that (italics in original):… if the constitutional conception of "equal protection of the laws" means anything, it must at the very least mean that a bare congressional desire to harm a politically unpopular group cannot constitute a legitimate governmental interest.Referring to the concept of animus explicitly later in the same passage, the Supreme Court formulated the doctrine thus in United States v. Windsor (2013):
[The Defense of Marriage Act] seeks to injure the very class New York seeks to protect. By doing so it violates basic due process and equal protection principles applicable to the Federal Government.

Further reading

References 

Criminal law
Legal terminology
Divorce law
Roman law
United States constitutional law